The Adaro were malevolent merman-like sea spirits found in the mythology of Makira island, in the Solomon Islands.

The name
The word adaro is from the Arosi language; it had several meanings, including 'corpse; ghost; soul; spirit'. It contrasts with aunga, a positive word for 'soul'.

Characteristics
Adaro is a unique creature that lived in the Pacific Ocean. The Adaro is very dangerous. Said to arise from the wicked part of a person's spirit, which is divided between the Aunga (good) which dies, and the Adaro (evil) which stays as a ghost. An adaro is described as a man with gills behind his ears, tail fins for feet, a horn like a shark's dorsal fin, and a swordfish or sawfish-like spear growing out of his head. They may also travel in Jaratep or Daretep waterspouts and along rainbows and are said to kill unwary fishermen by firing flying poisonous fish at them. Will visit man in their dreams to teach them new song and dance. Their chief is name Ngorieru and is said to live off the coast of San Christobal. Passing boats will use their paddles softly so as to not disturb them.

Notes

References
 

Solomon Islands mythology
Water spirits
Melanesian legendary creatures
Piscine and amphibian humanoids
Mermen
Fictional sharks